Benedict 'Ben' William Kemp (born 26 May 1993) is an English former first-class cricketer.

The son of the cricketer Nick Kemp, he was born at Canterbury and was educated at St Edmund's School Canterbury, before going up to Oxford Brookes University. While studying at Oxford Brookes, he made three appearances in first-class cricket for Oxford MCCU against Worcestershire in 2012 and Warwickshire and Worcestershire in 2013. He scored 23 runs in his three matches, with a high score of 11, With his right-arm fast-medium bowling, he took 7 wickets at an average of 42.14 and best figures of 3 for 31.

Notes and references

External links

English cricketers
Oxford MCCU cricketers
1993 births
Living people
People from Canterbury
People educated at St Edmund's School Canterbury
Alumni of Oxford Brookes University